Krynica-Zdrój  (until 31 December 2001 Krynica) is a town in Nowy Sącz County, Lesser Poland Voivodeship, southern Poland. It is inhabited by over eleven thousand people. It is the biggest spa town in Poland often called the Pearl of Polish Spas; and a popular tourist and winter sports destination situated in the heart of the Beskids mountain range.

History and economy
Krynica was first recorded in official documents in 1547 and became a town in 1889. Due to its convenient location, infrastructure and rail connections with major cities in Europe, Krynica-Zdrój (Zdrój means mineral spring in Polish) was the location of winter sports tournaments during the interwar period, including the 1931 World Ice Hockey Championships and the 1935 FIL European Luge Championships. In the post-war period, the town has hosted the 1958 and 1962 FIL World Luge Championships, the 2004 Euro Ice Hockey Challenge, and the 2018 and 2020 Winter World Polonia Games.

A gondola lift built in 1997 on the Jaworzyna Krynicka mountain overlooking Krynica, and subsequent investment in modern skiing facilities (apart from the former track of bobsleigh) made Krynica one of the most important ski resorts in Poland. Nearby Beskid Sądecki mountains are also a perfect setting for recreational cross-country skiing in winter and mountain-biking in summer.

The winter sport of bandy returned to Poland in the 2010s, after many decades. When the country made their first international appearance in 2006 at the World Championships for boys U15 in Edsbyn, Krynica-Zdrój contributed with most players.

Krynica was home to Nikifor (birth name Epifaniusz Drowniak), a famous naïve painter in communist Poland.

Points of interest
 Koncertowa in Park Slotwinski built in 1870 (today with a restaurant inside)
 Pump-room Slotwinka in Park Slotwinski built in 1815 (open only in summer)
 Historical 19th-century villas including The Góral Villa, The Biała Róża Villa , The Janina Villa and The Biały Orzeł Villa
 19th-century Greek Catholic Tserkva of Guardianship of the Blessed Virgin Mary
 Modernist Patria Hotel designed by Bohdan Pniewski and built in 1932

International relations
Krynica was sometimes nicknamed "Eastern Davos" for the Economic Forum held there each year in September since 1992 until the forum was transferred to the Lower Silesian town of Karpacz in 2019. Politicians (including heads of state) and businessmen from several countries of Central Europe, Russia, Central Asia and the Middle East met there to discuss economic and political matters. Also, part of the inhabitants of Krynica belong to the Lemko minority who speak an Eastern Slavic language called Rusyn.

Twin towns — Sister cities

Krynica-Zdrój is twinned with:
 Amersham, England, United Kingdom
 Bad Sooden-Allendorf, Hesse, Germany
 Batu, Indonesia
 Malang, Indonesia
 Bardejov, Slovakia

Notable people
Rabbi Mayer Yisroel Isser Friedman, rabbi
Henryk Ebers (1855–1919), physician
Henryk Szost (born 1982), long-distance runner
Jakub Czerwiński (born 1991), footballer
Katarzyna Kawa (born 1992), tennis player
Jan Kiepura (1902–1966), singer and actor
Joanna Kulig (born 1982), actress
Nikifor Krynicki, (1895–1968), naïve painter

See also
List of spa towns
Kudowa-Zdrój
Szczawnica

External links
www.atrakcjekrynicy.pl
www.krynica-zdroj.pl
www.krynica-zdroj.com
www.jaworzyna.pl
www.jaworzynakrynicka.pl
www.krynica.pl
www.krynica.com.pl
www.krynica.net.pl
www.twojakrynica.pl
Krynica Agroturystyka
 Jewish Community in Krynica-Zdrój on Virtual Shtetl

References

Notes

Cities and towns in Lesser Poland Voivodeship
Nowy Sącz County
Kingdom of Galicia and Lodomeria
Kraków Voivodeship (1919–1939)
Spa towns in Poland